The 2014 Open GDF Suez Nantes Atlantique is a professional tennis tournament played on indoor hard courts. It is the 12th edition of the tournament which is part of the 2014 ITF Women's Circuit, offering a total of $50,000+H in prize money. It takes place in Nantes, France between 27 October to 2 November 2014.

Singles main-draw entrants

Seeds

1 Rankings are as of October 20, 2014

Other entrants
The following players received wildcards into the singles main draw:
 Fiona Ferro
 Amandine Hesse
 Virginie Razzano
 Margot Yerolymos

The following players received entry from the qualifying draw:
 Audrey Albié
 Akgul Amanmuradova
 Stéphanie Foretz
 Lyudmyla Kichenok

The following player received entry from a lucky loser spot:
 Nadiia Kichenok

Champions

Singles

 Kateřina Siniaková def.  Ons Jabeur, 7–5, 6–2

Doubles

 Lyudmyla Kichenok /  Nadiia Kichenok def.  Stéphanie Foretz /  Amandine Hesse, 6–2, 6–3

External links
Official website 
2014 Open GDF Suez Nantes Atlantique at ITFtennis.com

Open GDF Suez Nantes Atlantique
Open Nantes Atlantique
Open GDF Suez Nantes Atlantique
Open GDF Suez Nantes Atlantique